SMBC Insight (See Media Broadcasting Channel Insight) is a Hindi-language 24/7 News television channel, owned by See Media Services private Limited.

References

Hindi-language television channels in India
Television channels and stations established in 2015
Hindi-language television stations
Television channels based in Noida
Television channels based in Lucknow
2015 establishments in Uttar Pradesh